Thirteen at the Table (French: Treize à table) is a 1955 French comedy film directed by André Hunebelle and starring Micheline Presle, Fernand Gravey and Germaine Montero.

The film's sets were designed by the art director Lucien Carré.

Cast

References

Bibliography 
 James Robert Parish. Film Actors Guide. Scarecrow Press, 1977.

External links 
 

1955 films
French comedy films
1955 comedy films
1950s French-language films
Films directed by André Hunebelle
Pathé films
French black-and-white films
1950s French films